This is a list of the moths of family Tortricidae which are found in Chile. It also acts as an index to the species articles and forms part of the full List of moths of Chile. Subfamilies are listed alphabetically.

Subfamily Chlidanotinae

Tribe Polyorthini
Lypothora fernaldi (Butler, 1883)
Lypothora walsinghamii (Butler, 1883)

Subfamily Olethreutinae

Tribe Eucosmini
Crocidosema insulana Aurivillius, 1922
Epinotia nigrovenata Razowski & Pelz, 2010
Rhyacionia buoliana ([Denis & Schiffermüller], 1775)

Tribe Olethreutini
Eccopsis galapagana Razowski & Landry, 2008
Eccopsis razowskii Vargas, 2011

Tribe Grapholitini
Cryptophlebia cortesi Clarke, 1986
Cryptophlebia saileri Clarke, 1986
Cydia pomonella (Linnaeus, 1775)

Subfamily Tortricinae

Tribe Euliini
Accuminulia buscki Brown, 2000
Accuminulia longiphallus Brown, 2000
Acmanthina acmanthes (Meyrick, 1931)
Acmanthina albipuncta Brown, 2000
Acmanthina molinana Razowski & Pelz, 2010
Argentulia gentilii Brown, 1998
Argentulia montana (Bartlett-Calvert, 1893)
Chapoania dentigera Razowski, 1999
Chileulia stalactitis (Meyrick, 1931)
Chileulia yerbalocae Razowski & Pelz, 2010
Chilips claduncus Razowski, 1988
Eliachna chileana Razowski, 1999
Eliachna digitana Brown & McPherson, 2002
Eliachna hemicordata Brown & McPherson, 2002
Exoletuncus artifex Razowski, 1997
Haemateulia barrigana Razowski & González, 2003
Haemateulia haematitis (Meyrick, 1931)
Haemateulia placens Razowski & Pelz, 2010
Nesochoris brachystigma Clarke, 1965
Nesochoris holographa Clarke, 1965
Phtheochroa inexacta Butler, 1883
Proeulia aethalea Obraztsov, 1964
Proeulia apospasta Obraztsov, 1964
Proeulia approximata (Butler, 1883)
Proeulia auraria (Clarke, 1949)
Proeulia chancoana Razowski & Pelz, 2010
Proeulia chromaffinis Razowski, 1995
Proeulia chrysopteris (Butler, 1883)
Proeulia clenchi Clarke, 1980
Proeulia cneca Obraztsov, 1964
Proeulia cnecona Razowski, 1995
Proeulia domeykoi Razowski & Pelz, 2010
Proeulia elguetae Razowski, 1999
Proeulia exusta (Butler, 1883)
Proeulia gielisi Razowski & Pelz, 2010
Proeulia gladiator Razowski, 1999
Proeulia griseiceps (Aurivillius, 1922)
Proeulia guayacana Razowski, 1999
Proeulia inconspicua Obraztsov, 1964
Proeulia insperata Razowski, 1995
Proeulia kuscheli Clarke, 1980
Proeulia lentescens Razowski, 1995
Proeulia leonina (Butler, 1883)
Proeulia limaria Razowski & Pelz, 2010
Proeulia longula Razowski & Pelz, 2010
Proeulia macrobasana Razowski & Pelz, 2010
Proeulia mauleana Razowski & Pelz, 2010
Proeulia nubleana Razowski & González, 2003
Proeulia onerata Razowski, 1995
Proeulia paronerata Razowski & Pelz, 2010
Proeulia robinsoni (Aurivillius, 1922)
Proeulia rucapillana Razowski & Pelz, 2010
Proeulia schouteni Razowski & Pelz, 2010
Proeulia sublentescens Razowski & Pelz, 2010
Proeulia talcana Razowski & Pelz, 2010
Proeulia tenontias (Meyrick, 1912)
Proeulia tricornuta Razowski & Pelz, 2010
Proeulia triquetra Obraztsov, 1964
Proeulia vanderwolfi Razowski & Pelz, 2010
Ptychocroca apenicillia Brown & Razowski, 2003
Ptychocroca crocoptycha (Meyrick, 1931)
Ptychocroca galenia Razowski, 1999
Ptychocroca keelioides Brown & Razowski, 2003
Ptychocroca lineabasalis Brown & Razowski, 2003
Ptychocroca nigropenicillia Brown & Razowski, 2003
Ptychocroca simplex Brown & Razowski, 2003
Ptychocroca wilkinsonii (Butler, 1883)
Rebinea brunnea Razowski & Pelz, 2010
Rebinea erebina (Butler, 1883)
Recintona cnephasiodes Razowski, 1999
Sericoris cauquenensis Butler, 1883
Seticosta coquimbana Razowski & Pelz, 2010
Silenis eurydice (Butler, 1883)
Varifula fulvaria (Blanchard, 1852)
Varifula trancasiana Razowski & Pelz, 2010
Villarica villaricae Razowski & Pelz, 2010

External links

  2010: Tortricidae from Chile (Lepidoptera: Tortricidae). Shilap Revista de Lepidopterologia 38 (149): 5-55.
 A new species of Eccopsis Zeller (Lepidoptera, Tortricidae) from the coastal valleys of northern Chile, with the first continental record of E. galapagana Razowski & Landry

.T
Chile
Moths, Tortricidae